The Australian Heavyweight Wrestling Championship was the first Heavyweight professional wrestling championship in Australia.

Title history

See also

Professional wrestling in Australia

References

External links

Heavyweight wrestling championships
Continental professional wrestling championships
National professional wrestling championships
Professional wrestling in Australia